The Natisone Valley dialect, or Nadiža dialect, is a Slovene dialect spoken mainly in Venetian Slovenia, but also in a small part of Slovenia. It is one of the two dialects in the Littoral dialect group to have its own written form, along with Resian. It is closely related to the Torre Valley dialect, which has a higher degree of vowel reduction but shares practically the same accented vowel system. It borders the Torre Valley dialect to the northwest, the Soča dialect to the northeast, the Karst dialect to the southeast, the Brda dialect to the south, and Friulian to the west. The dialect belongs to the Littoral dialect group, and it evolved from Venetian–Karst dialect base.

Classification 
The Natisone Valley dialect is a dialect of Slovene, an Indo-European language belonging to the western subgroup of the South Slavic branch of the Slavic languages. It is quite different from standard Slovene because the standard language is based on the Lower Carniolan and Upper Carniolan dialects, which formed from the southeastern proto-dialect, whereas the Natisone Valley dialect formed from the northwestern proto-dialect and shows many similarities with other dialects in the Littoral dialect group.

Nonetheless, the Natisone Valley dialect and standard Slovene are easily mutually intelligible. Even though the dialect has many words derived from Friulian, it can still be quite easily understood by most Slovene speakers, unlike the Torre Valley dialect and Resian.

Geographic distribution 
The dialect is mainly spoken in northeastern Italy, in Venetian Slovenia. It is spoken along four rivers: the Natisone and its three tributaries: the Alberone, Cosizza, and Erbezzo, up to San Pietro al Natisone. In Slovenia, it encompasses the area west of the Kolovrat range, with villages including Ukanje and Kostanjevica (part of Lig), as well as villages around Livek. Larger towns can only be found in Italy, such as San Pietro al Natisone, Sanguarzo, Purgessimo, San Leonardo, and Masseris.

Further division 
The Natisone Valley dialect is rather uniform.

Accent 
The Natisone Valley dialect has pitch accent on long syllables. It also differentiates between long and short syllables, both can occur anywhere in a word. There is, however, tendency to lengthen historically short vowels. Accent is on the same syllable as in Alpine Slavic, which is different from Standard Slovene, which has undergone  →  and optionally  →  shifts (e. g. NV žená, SS žéna 'wife').

Diacritics 
Similarly to standard Slovene, the Natisone Valley dialect also has diacritics to denote accent. The accent is free and therefore it must be denoted with a diacritic. Three standard diacritics are used; however, they do not show tonal oppositions.

The three diacritics are:

 The grave ( ` ) indicates a long vowel:  (IPA ).
 The acute ( ´ ) indicates a short vowel:  (IPA ).
 The dot above ( ˙ ) indicates an extra-short vowel:  (IPA ).
In addition, there is also the caron ( ˇ ), which indicates that a vowel can be either long or short.

Phonology 
The phonology of the Natisone Valley dialect is similar to that of standard Slovene. Two major exceptions are the presence of diphthongs and the existence of palatal consonants. However, the dialect is not uniform, and differences exist between eastern and western microdialects.

Consonants 
The Natisone Valley dialect has 24 (in the east 25) distinct phonemes, in comparison to 22 in standard Slovene.

Vowels 
The phonology of the Natisone Valley dialect is similar to that of standard Slovene, but it has a seven-vowel (eastern microdialects eight-vowel) system; two of those are diphthongs.<div style="display: inline-block; vertical-align: top; margin-right: 1em;">

Evolutionary perspective 
The Natisone Valley dialect experienced lengthening of non-final vowels, and these became undistinguishable from their long counterparts, except for *ò. The vowel *ě̄ then turned into ie, and *ō into uo. Long *ə̄ turned into aː. Other long mid vowels (*ē, *ę̄, *ò, *ǭ) turned into eː and oː, respectively. The vowels *ī, *ū''', and *ā remained unchanged. Syllabic *ł̥̄ turned into uː and syllabic r̥̄ turned into ar in the west and ər in the east.

Vowel reduction is almost non-existent; there is some akanye, e-akanye, and ikanye, but examples are rare. The only more common feature is loss of final -i, but even this is not the case in some more remote villages, such as Montemaggiore and Stermizza. Short ə turned into either a or i in the west; in the east it remained ə only as a fill vowel. The cluster *ję- turned into i.

The palatal consonants remained palatal, but *ĺ turned into j in the west and *t’ turned into *č́. The consonant *g turned into ɣ and into x at the end of a word.
</div>

 Morphology 
The Natisone Valley dialect still has neuter gender in the singular, but it feminized in the plural. It still has the masculine and neuter o-stem declension, as well as the feminine a-stem and i-stem declension. There is also a masculine j-stem, as well as the remains of the feminine v-stem and neuter s-, t-, and n-stems. These are mostly limited to single words. However, the dialect has more archaic declension patterns that differ considerably from standard Slovene:

The infinitive has lost the final -i, but it has the same accent as the long infinitive.

 Vocabulary 
There are many loanwords borrowed from Friulian and Italian, but not as much as in Torre Valley dialect. Words from Proto-Slavic received pretty close evolution to that of Standard Slovene, so both varieties are mutually intelligible.

 Orthography 
The dialect's orthography is mainly based on western microdialects. It has 26 letters; 25 of them are the same as in the Slovene alphabet, and  has been added for the phoneme , which is written  in Standard Slovene.

The orthography thus underdifferentiates several phonemic distinctions:

 Stress, vowel length, and tone are not distinguished, except with optional diacritics when it is necessary to distinguish between similar words with a different meaning.
 The letter  is used to write syllabic  as well as non-syllabic "false u" .

 Regulation 
The Natisone Valley dialect is unregulated, and thus a fair degree of variation is common in both pronunciation and writing. The eastern microdialects are completely unstandardized, like most other Slovene dialects. In contrast, the western microdialects have their own dictionary and grammar, written by Nino Špehonja in 2012. The dictionary still allows many variations in writing, and consequently pronunciation.

References

 Bibliography 

 
 
 
 
 

Further reading
 Nino Špehonja, Nediška gramatika,''  grammar of Natisone Valley dialect (in Italian).
 Nino Špehonja, Vocabolario Italiano-Nediško, Italian-Natisone Valley dialect dictionary (in Italian).

Slovene dialects
Languages of Friuli-Venezia Giulia